Turgi railway station is a railway station in the municipality of Turgi in the Swiss canton of Aargau. The station is located on the Zurich to Olten main line, and is the junction for the Turgi–Koblenz–Waldshut line.

Services 
The following services stop at Turgi:

 Zürich S-Bahn:
 Aargau S-Bahn:
 : half-hourly service to Aarau and hourly service to Sursee.

References

External links 
 
 

Railway stations in the canton of Aargau
Swiss Federal Railways stations
Railway stations in Switzerland opened in 1856